Noah S. Diffenbaugh (born ) is an American climate scientist at Stanford University, where he is the Kara J Foundation Professor of Earth System Science and Kimmelman Family Senior Fellow at the Stanford Woods Institute for the Environment, and an affiliate at the Precourt Institute for Energy. From 2015-2018, he served as editor-in-chief of the peer-review journal Geophysical Research Letters (published by American Geophysical Union). He is known for his research on the climate system, including the effects of global warming on extreme weather and climate events such as the 2011-2017 California drought.

Scientific research
Diffenbaugh received his Ph.D. in Earth Sciences from the University of California, Santa Cruz in 2003. His dissertation was entitled “Global and regional controls on Holocene environments”. His dissertation focused on understanding regional climate change in paleoclimate periods and in modern periods. His dissertation introduced the hypothesis that as vegetation responds to changes in climate, those changes could impact coastal ocean systems by altering the atmospheric pressure patterns that drive coastal winds.

In 2004, Diffenbaugh began a faculty position at Purdue University. While at Purdue, he published first results of high-resolution regional climate simulations for large continental areas, including the United States, Europe and India, which enabled analysis of the role of fine-scale climate processes in extreme events. These high-resolution climate model simulations also enabled analyses of potential impacts of climate change on a suite of systems, including premium winegrapes, corn pests, and snowmelt runoff.

In 2009, Diffenbaugh moved to a faculty position at Stanford University. He continued his work on the dynamics and impacts of fine-scale climate change, and also began working in the emerging area of “extreme event attribution”. This work culminated in the publication of a new, generalized framework for testing the influence of global warming on individual extreme weather and climate events.

The extreme event for which Diffenbaugh is most well known is the 2011-2017 California drought. From 2014-2016, Diffenbaugh's research group published three widely cited papers analyzing the drought and the role of global warming. These studies analyzed the role of high temperature in amplifying the effects of low precipitation, as well as the role of the Ridiculously Resilient Ridge, a term coined by Diffenbaugh's then-Ph.D. student Daniel Swain to describe the large area of persistently high atmospheric pressure that blocked many storms from reaching California for much of the drought.

At Stanford, Diffenbaugh also began collaborations to quantify the economic impacts of climate change. This work has included quantifying the economic damages associated with different levels of global warming (including the levels identified in the UN Paris Agreement), as well as the role that global warming has played in shaping economic inequality between countries.

Science communication
Diffenbaugh is active in science communication. He has served on a number of government science panels, including the Intergovernmental Panel on Climate Change, the United States Climate Change Science Program, and the California Climate-Safe Infrastructure Working Group. He has provided testimony to the United States Congress and the California State Assembly. He was also a member of the What We Know panel of the American Association for the Advancement of Science.

Diffenbaugh has written a number of opinion articles. These include op-eds in The New York Times about extreme climate events such as the 2011-2017 California drought and Hurricane Harvey, and the process of climate science. He has also written for the public on the importance of peer review, including a Top 10 list of reviewer comments that Diffenbaugh stated came from papers on which he was the first author.

Diffenbaugh frequently speaks to the public about climate change. In 2011, he was a Google Science Communication Fellow. He was an early adopter of Hangouts On Air, through which he conducted open discussions about climate change with the public.

In 2017, Diffenbaugh was the faculty moderator for Stanford University's Three Books Program, in which all incoming first-year undergraduate students are sent three books over the summer, and the authors come to campus for a panel discussion during New Student Orientation. Diffenbaugh selected the theme of “Sustainability and Equity”, and assigned Salvage The Bones by Jesmyn Ward, Homegoing by Yaa Gyasi, and The Sixth Extinction by Elizabeth Kolbert. About choosing the books, Diffenbaugh said, "Once you begin to examine the relationship between people and the environment, it becomes clear that the big global challenges for this generation lie at the intersection of sustainability and equity – the two are inextricably linked." At Stanford, he teaches a course called "The Global Warming Paradox" that examines this challenge.

Personal life
Diffenbaugh discussed his upbringing in a 2017 interview on the science podcast Forecast. Diffenbaugh grew up at Mount Madonna Center, an intentional community in the Santa Cruz Mountains of California that was founded in 1978 by Diffenbaugh's parents and other students of Baba Hari Dass. He attended Mount Madonna School from kindergarten through high school, graduating in 1992.

Diffenbaugh attended college at Stanford University, where he was a member of the varsity men's volleyball team. After college, he returned to Mount Madonna Center for three years. During that time, he taught high school science and coached volleyball at Mount Madonna School, before entering graduate school at the University of California, Santa Cruz, where he describes struggling to find a sense of scientific confidence and direction.

Diffenbaugh and his wife Polly Diffenbaugh live on the Stanford campus, and have three children. He is the grandson of computer pioneer Erwin Tomash, and brother-in-law of novelist Vanessa Diffenbaugh.

Selected publications

Journal articles
Diffenbaugh, N.S. and M. Burke, Global warming has increased economic inequality between countries, Proceedings of the National Academy of Sciences, 10.1073/pnas.1816020116, 2019.
Burke, M., W.M. Davis and N.S. Diffenbaugh, Large potential reduction in economic damages under UN mitigation targets, Nature, 557(7706), 549–553, 2018.
Diffenbaugh, N.S., D. Singh, J.S. Mankin, D.E. Horton, D.L. Swain, D. Touma, A. Charland, Y. Liu, M. Haugen, M. Tsiang and B. Rajaratnam, Quantifying the influence of global warming on unprecedented extreme climate events, Proceedings of the National Academy of Sciences, 114(19), 4881–4886, 2017.
Diffenbaugh, N.S., D.L. Swain and D. Touma, Anthropogenic warming has increased drought risk in California, Proceedings of the National Academy of Sciences, 112(13), 3931-3936, 2015.
Diffenbaugh, N.S. and C.B. Field, Changes in ecologically-critical terrestrial climate conditions, Science, 341(6145), 486-492, 2013.
Diffenbaugh, N.S., M. Scherer and R.J. Trapp, Robust increases in severe thunderstorm environments in response to greenhouse forcing, Proceedings of the National Academy of Sciences, 11(41), 16361–16366, doi:10.1073/pnas.1307758110, 2013.
Diffenbaugh, N.S. and F. Giorgi, Climate change hotspots in the CMIP5 global climate model ensemble, Climatic Change Letters, 114 (3-4), 813-822, 2012.
Diffenbaugh, N.S. and M. Scherer, Observational and model evidence for global emergence of unprecedented heat in the 20th and 21st centuries, Climatic Change, 10.1007/s10584-011-0112-y, 2011.
Diffenbaugh, N.S. and M. Ashfaq, Intensification of hot extremes in the United States, Geophysical Research Letters, L15701, doi:10.1029/2010GL043888, 2010.
Diffenbaugh, N.S., J.S. Pal, F. Giorgi and X. Gao, Heat stress intensification in the Mediterranean climate change hotspot, Geophysical Research Letters, 34, L11706, doi:10.1029/2007GL030000, 2007.
Diffenbaugh, N.S., J.S. Pal, R.J. Trapp and F. Giorgi, Fine-scale processes regulate the response of extreme events to global climate change, Proceedings of the National Academy of Sciences, 102(44), 15774-15778, 2005.
Diffenbaugh, N.S., M.A. Snyder and L.C. Sloan, Could CO2-induced land cover feedbacks alter near-shore upwelling regimes?, Proceedings of the National Academy of Sciences, 101(1), 27-31, 2004.

Book chapters
Field, C.B., N.R. Chiariello and N.S. Diffenbaugh, Climate-change impacts on California ecosystems, in E. Zavaletta and H. Mooney, (eds), Ecosystems of California, University of California Press, 1008 pp, 2016.
White, M.A., G.V. Jones and N.S. Diffenbaugh, Climate variability, climate change, and wine production in the western United States, in F.H. Wagner (ed.), Climate Change in Western North America: Evidence and Environmental Effects, University of Utah Press, 288 pp, 2009.

References

External links
Research Group at Stanford University
Faculty Profile at Stanford University
Faculty page at the Stanford Woods Institute
ResearcherID page on Publons/Web of Science

Living people
American climatologists
Stanford University faculty
Stanford University alumni
University of California, Santa Cruz alumni
Academic journal editors
21st-century American scientists
1974 births